Realism is one of the dominant schools of thought in international relations theory, theoretically formalising the Realpolitik statesmanship of early modern Europe. Although a highly diverse body of thought, it is unified by the belief that world politics is always and necessarily a field of conflict among actors pursuing wealth and power. The theories of realism are contrasted by the cooperative ideals of liberalism in international relations.

Realists are divided into three classes based on their view of the essential causes of interstate conflict. Classical realists believe it follows from human nature; neorealists attribute it to the dynamics of the anarchic state system; neoclassical realists believe it results from both, in combination with domestic politics. Neorealists are also divided between defensive and offensive realism. Realists trace the history of their ideas back through classical antiquity, beginning with Thucydides.

Realism entails a spectrum of ideas, which tend to revolve around several central propositions, such as:

 State-centrism: states are the central actors in international politics, rather than leaders or international organizations;
 Anarchy: the international political system is anarchic, as there is no supranational authority to enforce rules;
 Rationality and/or egoism: states act in their rational self-interest within the international system; and 
 Power: states desire power to ensure self-preservation.

Realism is often associated with realpolitik, as both deal with the pursuit, possession, and application of power. Realpolitik, however, is an older prescriptive guideline limited to policy-making, while realism is a wider theoretical and methodological paradigm to describe, explain, and predict events in international relations. As an academic pursuit, realism is not necessarily tied to ideology; it does not favor any particular moral philosophy, nor does it consider ideology to be a major factor in the behavior of nations. However, realists are generally critical of liberal foreign policy. Priorities of realists have been described as Machiavellian, single-mindedly seeking the power of one's own nation over others, although realists also advocated the idea that powerful nations concede spheres of influence to other powerful nations.

Common assumptions 

The four propositions of realism are as follows.

 State-centrism: States are the most important actors.
 Anarchy: The international system is anarchic.
 No actor exists above states, capable of regulating their interactions; states must arrive at relations with other states on their own, rather than it being dictated to them by some higher controlling entity.
 The international system exists in a state of constant antagonism (anarchy).
 Egoism: All states within the system pursue narrow self-interests
 States tend to pursue self-interest.
 Groups strive to attain as many resources as possible (relative gain).
 Power politics: The primary concern of all states is power and security
 States build up their militaries to survive, which may lead to a security dilemma.

Realists think that mankind is not inherently benevolent but rather self-centered and competitive. This perspective, which is shared by theorists such as Thomas Hobbes, views human nature as egocentric (not necessarily selfish) and conflictual unless there exist conditions under which humans may coexist. It is also disposed of the notion that an individual's intuitive nature is made up of anarchy. In regards to self-interest, these individuals are self-reliant and are motivated in seeking more power. They are also believed to be fearful. This view contrasts with the approach of liberalism to international relations.

The state emphasises an interest in accumulating power to ensure security in an anarchic world. Power is a concept primarily thought of in terms of material resources necessary to induce harm or coerce other states (to fight and win wars). The use of power places an emphasis on coercive tactics being acceptable to either accomplish something in the national interest or avoid something inimical to the national interest. The state is the most important actor under realism. It is unitary and autonomous because it speaks and acts with one voice. The power of the state is understood in terms of its military capabilities. A key concept under realism is the international distribution of power referred to as system polarity. Polarity refers to the number of blocs of states that exert power in an international system. A multipolar system is composed of three or more blocs, a bipolar system is composed of two blocs, and a unipolar system is dominated by a single power or hegemon. Under unipolarity realism predicts that states will band together to oppose the hegemon and restore a balance of power. Although all states seek hegemony under realism as the only way to ensure their own security, other states in the system are incentivised to prevent the emergence of a hegemon through balancing.

States employ the rational model of decision making by obtaining and acting upon complete and accurate information. The state is sovereign and guided by a national interest defined in terms of power. Since the only constraint of the international system is anarchy, there is no international authority and states are left to their own devices to ensure their own security. Realists believe that sovereign states are the principal actors in the international system. International institutions, non-governmental organizations, multinational corporations, individuals and other sub-state or trans-state actors are viewed as having little independent influence. States are inherently aggressive (offensive realism) and obsessed with security (defensive realism). Territorial expansion is only constrained by opposing powers. This aggressive build-up, however, leads to a security dilemma whereby increasing one's security may bring along even greater instability as an opposing power builds up its own arms in response (an arms race). Thus, security becomes a zero-sum game where only relative gains can be made.

Realists believe that there are no universal principles with which all states may guide their actions. Instead, a state must always be aware of the actions of the states around it and must use a pragmatic approach to resolve problems as they arise. A lack of certainty regarding intentions prompts mistrust and competition between states.

Rather than assume that states are the central actors, some realists, such as William Wohlforth and Randall Schweller refer instead to "groups" as the key actors of interest.

Finally, states are sometimes described as "billiard balls" or "black boxes". This analogy is meant to underscore the secondary importance of internal state dynamics and decisionmaking in realist models, in stark contrast to bureaucratic or individual-level theories of international relations.

Realism in statecraft
The ideas behind George F. Kennan's work as a diplomat and diplomatic historian remain relevant to the debate over American foreign policy, which since the 19th century has been characterized by a shift from the Founding Fathers' realist school to the idealistic or Wilsonian school of international relations. In the realist tradition, security is based on the principle of a balance of power and the reliance on morality as the sole determining factor in statecraft is considered impractical. According to the Wilsonian approach, on the other hand, the spread of democracy abroad as a foreign policy is key and morals are universally valid. During the Presidency of Bill Clinton, American diplomacy reflected the Wilsonian school to such a degree that those in favor of the realist approach likened Clinton's policies to social work. Some argue that in Kennan's view of American diplomacy, based on the realist approach, such apparent moralism without regard to the realities of power and the national interest is self-defeating and may lead to the erosion of power, to America's detriment. Others argue that Kennan, a proponent of the Marshall Plan (which gave out bountiful American aid to post-WW2 countries), might agree that Clinton's aid functioned strategically to secure international leverage: a diplomatic maneuver well within the bounds of political realism as described by Hedley Bull.

Realists often hold that statesmen tend towards realism whereas realism is deeply unpopular among the public. When statesmen take actions that divert from realist policies, academic realists often argue that this is due to distortions that stem from domestic politics. However, some research suggests that realist policies are actually popular among the public whereas elites are more beholden to liberal ideas. Abrahamsen suggested that realpolitik for middle powers can include supporting idealism and liberal internationalism.

Historical branches and antecedents

Historian Jean Bethke Elshtain traces the historiography of realism:
The genealogy of realism as international relations, although acknowledging antecedents, gets down to serious business with Machiavelli, moving on to theorists of sovereignty and apologists for the national interest. It is present in its early modern forms with Hobbes's Leviathan (1651).

While realism as a formal discipline in international relations did not arrive until World War II, its primary assumptions have been expressed in earlier writings.

Modern realism began as a serious field of research in the United States during and after World War II. This evolution was partly fueled by European war migrants like Hans Morgenthau, whose work Politics Among Nations is considered a seminal development in the rise of modern realism. Other influential figures were George F. Kennan (known for his work on containment), Nicholas Spykman (known for his work on geostrategy and containment), Herman Kahn (known for his work on nuclear strategy) and E. H. Carr.

Classical realism

Classical realism states that it is fundamentally the nature of humans that pushes states and individuals to act in a way that places interests over ideologies. Classical realism is an ideology defined as the view that the "drive for power and the will to dominate [that are] held to be fundamental aspects of human nature".
Prominent classical realists:
 Hans Morgenthau
 Reinhold Niebuhr – Christian realism
 Raymond Aron
 George Kennan

Liberal realism or the English school or rationalism

The English school holds that the international system, while anarchical in structure, forms a "society of states" where common norms and interests allow for more order and stability than that which may be expected in a strict realist view. Prominent English School writer Hedley Bull's 1977 classic, The Anarchical Society, is a key statement of this position.

Prominent liberal realists:
 Hedley Bull – argued for both the existence of an international society of states and its perseverance even in times of great systemic upheaval, meaning regional or so-called "world wars"
 Martin Wight
 Barry Buzan

Neorealism or structural realism

Neorealism derives from classical realism except that instead of human nature, its focus is predominantly on the anarchic structure of the international system. States are primary actors because there is no political monopoly on force existing above any sovereign. While states remain the principal actors, greater attention is given to the forces above and below the states through levels of analysis or structure and agency debate. The international system is seen as a structure acting on the state with individuals below the level of the state acting as agency on the state as a whole.

While neorealism shares a focus on the international system with the English school, neorealism differs in the emphasis it places on the permanence of conflict. To ensure state security, states must be on constant preparation for conflict through economic and military build-up.

Prominent neorealists:
 Robert J. Art – neorealism
 Robert Gilpin – hegemonic theory
 Robert Jervis – defensive realism
 John Mearsheimer – offensive realism
 Barry Posen - neorealism
 Kenneth Waltz – defensive realism
 Stephen Walt – defensive realism

Neoclassical realism

Neoclassical realism can be seen as the third generation of realism, coming after the classical authors of the first wave (Thucydides, Niccolò Machiavelli, Thomas Hobbes) and the neorealists (especially Kenneth Waltz). Its designation of "neoclassical", then, has a double meaning:

 It offers the classics a renaissance;
 It is a synthesis of the neorealist and the classical realist approaches.

Gideon Rose is responsible for coining the term in a book review he wrote in 1998.

The primary motivation underlying the development of neoclassical realism was the fact that neorealism was only useful to explain political outcomes (classified as being theories of international politics), but had nothing to offer about particular states' behavior (or theories of foreign policy). The basic approach, then, was for these authors to "refine, not refute, Kenneth Waltz", by adding domestic intervening variables between systemic incentives and a state's foreign policy decision. Thus, the basic theoretical architecture of neoclassical realism is:

 Distribution of power in the international system (independent variable)
 Domestic perception of the system and domestic incentives (intervening variable)
 Foreign policy decision (dependent variable)

While neoclassical realism has only been used for theories of foreign policy so far, Randall Schweller notes that it could be useful to explain certain types of political outcomes as well.

Neoclassical realism is particularly appealing from a research standpoint because it still retains a lot of the theoretical rigor that Waltz has brought to realism, but at the same time can easily incorporate a content-rich analysis, since its main method for testing theories is the process-tracing of case studies.

Prominent neoclassical realists:
 Aaron Friedberg
 Randall Schweller
 William Wohlforth
 Fareed Zakaria

Realist constructivism
Some see a complementarity between realism and constructivism. Samuel Barkin, for instance, holds that "realist constructivism" can fruitfully "study the relationship between normative structures, the carriers of political morality, and uses of power" in ways that existing approaches do not. Similarly, Jennifer Sterling-Folker has argued that theoretical synthesis helps explanations of international monetary policy by combining realism's emphasis of an anarchic system with constructivism's insights regarding important factors from the domestic level. Scholars such as Oded Löwenheim and Ned Lebow have also been associated with realist constructivism.

Criticisms

Democratic peace
Democratic peace theory advocates also that realism is not applicable to democratic states' relations with each another as their studies claim that such states do not go to war with one another. However, realists and proponents of other schools have critiqued both this claim and the studies which appear to support it, claiming that its definitions of "war" and "democracy" must be tweaked in order to achieve the desired result. Furthermore, a realist government may not consider it in its interest to start a war for little gain, so realism does not necessarily mean constant battles.

Hegemonic peace and conflict
Robert Gilpin developed the theory of hegemonic stability theory within the realist framework, but limited it to the economic field. Niall Ferguson remarked that the theory has offered insights into the way that economic power works, but neglected the military and cultural aspects of power.

John Ikenberry and Daniel Deudney state that the Iraq War, conventionally blamed on liberal internationalism by realists, actually originates more closely from hegemonic realism. The "instigators of the war", they suggest, were hegemonic realists. Where liberal internationalists reluctantly supported the war, they followed arguments linked to interdependence realism relating to arms control. The realist scholar John Mearsheimer states that "One might think..." events including the Bush Doctrine are "evidence of untethered realism that unipolarity made possible," but disagrees and contends that various interventions are caused by a belief that a liberal international order can transcend power politics.

Inconsistent with non-European politics 
Scholars have argued that realist theories, in particular realist conceptions of anarchy and balances of power, have not characterized the international systems of East Asia and Africa (before, during and after colonization).

State-centrism 
Scholars have criticized realist theories of international relations for assuming that states are fixed and unitary units.

Appeasement 
In the mid-20th century, realism was seen as discredited in the United Kingdom due to its association with appeasement in the 1930s. It re-emerged slowly during the Cold War.

Scholar Aaron McKeil pointed to major illiberal tendencies within realism that, aiming for a sense of "restraint" against liberal interventionism, would lead to more proxy wars, and fail to offer institutions and norms for mitigating great power conflict.

Realism as degenerative research programs 
John A. Vasquez applied Imre Lakatos's criteria, and concluded that realist-based research program is seen as degenerating due to the protean character of its theoretical development, an unwillingness to specify what makes the true theory, a continuous adoption of auxiliary propostions to explain away flaws, and lack of strong research findings. Against Vasquez, Stephen Walt argued that Vasquez overlooked the progressive power of realist theory. Kenneth Waltz claimed that Vasquez misunderstood Lakatos.

See also
 Complex interdependence
 Consensus reality
 Consequentialism
 International legal theory
 Game theory
 Global justice
 Legalism (Chinese philosophy)
 Might makes right
 Negarchy
 Peace through strength
 Realpolitik
 Moral nihilism

References

Further reading

 Ashley, Richard K. "Political Realism and the Human Interests", International Studies Quarterly (1981) 25: 204–36.
 Barkin, J. Samuel Realist Constructivism: Rethinking International Relations Theory (Cambridge University Press; 2010) 202 pages. Examines areas of both tension and overlap between the two approaches to IR theory.
 Bell, Duncan, ed. Political Thought and International Relations: Variations on a Realist Theme. Oxford: Oxford University Press, 2008.
 Booth, Ken. 1991. "Security in anarchy: Utopian realism in theory and practice", International Affairs 67(3), pp. 527–545
 Crawford; Robert M. A. Idealism and Realism in International Relations: Beyond the Discipline (2000) online edition
 Donnelly; Jack. Realism and International Relations (2000) online edition
 Gilpin, Robert G. "The richness of the tradition of political realism", International Organization (1984), 38:287–304
 Griffiths; Martin. Realism, Idealism, and International Politics: A Reinterpretation (1992) online edition
 Guilhot Nicolas, ed. The Invention of International Relations Theory: Realism, the Rockefeller Foundation, and the 1954 Conference on Theory (2011)
 Keohane, Robert O., ed. Neorealism and its Critics (1986)
 Lebow, Richard Ned. The Tragic Vision of Politics: Ethics, Interests and Orders. Cambridge: Cambridge University Press, 2003.
 Mearsheimer, John J., "The Tragedy of Great Power Politics." New York: W.W. Norton & Company, 2001. [Seminal text on Offensive Neorealism]
 Meyer, Donald. The Protestant Search for Political Realism, 1919–1941 (1988) online edition
 Molloy, Sean. The Hidden History of Realism: A Genealogy of Power Politics. New York: Palgrave, 2006.
 Morgenthau, Hans. "Scientific Man versus Power Politics" (1946) Chicago, IL: University of Chicago Press.
 "Politics Among Nations: The Struggle for Power and Peace" (1948) New York NY: Alfred A. Knopf.
 "In Defense of the National Interest" (1951) New York, NY: Alfred A. Knopf.
 "The Purpose of American Politics" (1960) New York, NY: Alfred A. Knopf.
 Murray, A. J. H., Reconstructing Realism: Between Power Politics and Cosmopolitan Ethics. Edinburgh: Keele University Press, 1997.
 Rösch, Felix. "Unlearning Modernity. A Realist Method for Critical International Relations?." Journal of International Political Theory 13, no. 1 (2017): 81–99. 
 Rosenthal, Joel H. Righteous Realists: Political Realism, Responsible Power, and American Culture in the Nuclear Age. (1991). 191 pp. Compares Reinhold Niebuhr, Hans J. Morgenthau, Walter Lippmann, George F. Kennan, and Dean Acheson
 Scheuerman, William E. 2010. "The (classical) Realist vision of global reform." International Theory 2(2): pp. 246–282.
 Schuett, Robert. Political Realism, Freud, and Human Nature in International Relations. New York: Palgrave, 2010.
 Smith, Michael Joseph. Realist Thought from Weber to Kissinger (1986)
 Tjalve, Vibeke S. Realist Strategies of Republican Peace: Niebuhr, Morgenthau, and the Politics of Patriotic Dissent. New York: Palgrave, 2008.
 Williams, Michael C. The Realist Tradition and the Limits of International Relations. Cambridge: Cambridge University Press, 2005. online edition

External links
 Political Realism in International Relations in Stanford Encyclopedia of Philosophy
 
 Richard K. Betts, "Realism", YouTube

Political realism
International relations theory